"These Days" is a song recorded by Irish singer-songwriter Brian Kennedy, featuring Ronan Keating. It was released in September 1999 as the lead single from Kennedy's third studio album, Now That I Know What I Want. "These Days" peaked at number 4 on the Irish charts. 

In Irish magazine VIP, in November 1999, Keating said, "Brian and myself are old friends and we go back a long way now. It was nothing but a pleasure to work with someone as talented as Brian."

Track listing
CD single
 "These Days" - 4:04
 "I'll Be Waiting" - 3:28
 "Under Irish Stars" - 3:56
 "Interview with Brian Kennedy and Ronan Keating" - 3:29

Charts

References

1999 singles
Ronan Keating songs
1999 songs